Vijaya Nirmala (born Nidudavolu Nirmala; 20 February 1946 – 27 June 2019) was an Indian actress, director, and producer known for her works predominantly in Telugu cinema along with a few Malayalam and Tamil films. In a career spanning over six decades, she acted in more than 200 films and directed 44 films. In 2002, she entered the Guinness Book of World Records as the female director who has directed the most number of films in the world. In 2008, she received the Raghupathi Venkaiah Award for lifetime achievement in Telugu cinema.

Born as Nirmala, she ventured into acting as a child artist with films like Macha Rekai (1950) and Panduranga Mahatyam (1957). She debuted as a lead actress in the 1964 Malayalam film Bhargavi Nilayam which became one of the biggest hits of that year. She then acted in the Tamil film Enga Veettu Penn (1965) produced by Vijaya Productions. She added Vijaya to her name as a mark of gratitude to the production house that gave her a break as an artiste. She debuted as a leading lady in Telugu with Rangula Ratnam (1966).

She made her directorial debut in Telugu with Meena (1973) and went on to direct over 44 films. She acted with her husband Krishna in over 40 films from Sakshi (1967) to Sri Sri (2016) and the duo was considered as a hit pair. She launched her own production house – Vijaya Krishna Movies and went onto produce 15 films on the banner. She also handled the operations of Padmalaya Studios and Padmalaya Tele Films. Her son Naresh is also a noted actor in Telugu cinema.

Early life 
She was born as Nidudavolu Nirmala on 20 February 1946 into a Telugu family settled in Tamil Nadu who were originally from Narasaraopet. Her father was a film producer. Her paternal uncle is scholar and literary historian, Nidudavolu Venkatarao.  Actress Jayasudha is Venkatrao's granddaughter while singer R. Balasaraswathi Devi is her paternal aunt's daughter.

Personal life 
Vijaya Nirmala was married to Krishna Murthy and had a son Naresh, who is also an actor. She later married actor Krishna.

Career 
Vijaya Nirmala entered cinema as a child artist with the Tamil movie Macha Rekai (1950). At age eleven, she debuted in Telugu films with Panduranga Mahatmyam (1957). In 1964, she starred opposite Prem Nazir and rose to stardom with the Malayalam film Bhargavi Nilayam. Also, in 1967, she starred again opposite Prem Nazir in Udhyogastha, by P. Venu. She debuted in the Telugu industry in the film Rangula Ratnam (1966).

Her first film in Tamil was Enga Veettu Penn (1965), which was followed by Panama Pasama (1968), Uyira Maanama (1968), En Annan (1970), and Gnana Oli (1972). She met her second husband Krishna on the sets of Sakshi (1967), her second film in Telugu, and they starred together in 47 films. It was Sakshi that kindled her interest in direction. She has acted in over 200 films with 25 each in Malayalam and Tamil, and the remaining in Telugu.

Her small screen debut came with Balaji Telefilms' Pelli Kanuka. Soon after, she launched her own banner Vijaya Krishna Movies and produced 15 films. She added Vijaya to her name as a gratitude to the production house. She made her directorial debut with a Malayalam film on a budget of 3 lakhs. She made her directorial debut in Telugu with Meena and directed 40 films in Telugu and one film each in Malayalam (directorial debut film) and Tamil (Kungumachimizh). The actress-director was based in Hyderabad and managed Padmalaya Studios and Padmalaya Telefilms Ltd.

Selected filmography

Telugu

Malayalam

Tamil

Director

See also 
 Raghupathi Venkaiah Award

References

External links

2019 deaths
Telugu film directors
Indian women film directors
Nandi Award winners
Actresses in Malayalam cinema
Indian film actresses
1946 births
Film producers from Tamil Nadu
Malayalam film directors
20th-century Indian film directors
Film directors from Tamil Nadu
21st-century Indian film directors
Actresses in Telugu cinema
20th-century Indian actresses
Actresses from Tamil Nadu
Women artists from Tamil Nadu
Actresses in Tamil cinema